Cymothoe coranus, the blonde glider or coast glider, is a butterfly of the family Nymphalidae. It is found from South Africa to Zimbabwe, Kenya, Malawi and Tanzania.

The wingspan is 50–60 mm for males and 60–68 mm for females. Adults are on wing year round, but mainly from February to April. Peaks occur from October to December.

The larvae feed on Rawsonia lucida.

Subspecies
Cymothoe coranus coranus (coast of Kenya, eastern Tanzania, Mozambique, eastern Zimbabwe, Swaziland, South Africa: Mpumalanga, KwaZulu-Natal, Eastern Cape Province)
Cymothoe coranus dowsetti Beaurain, 1988 (Malawi: west to Kasitu Rock)
Cymothoe coranus kiellandi Beaurain, 1988 (western Tanzania)
Cymothoe coranus murphyi Beaurain, 1988 (Malawi: Mount Mlanje)

References

Butterflies described in 1889
Cymothoe (butterfly)
Butterflies of Africa
Taxa named by Henley Grose-Smith